The General Service Medal can refer to any of the following medals:

 General Service Medal (1918)
 General Service Medal 1947, India
 General Service Medal (1962)
 General Service Medal (Bophuthatswana)
 General Service Medal (Canada)
 General Service Medal (Malaysia)
 General Services Medal (Oman)
 General Service Medal (Rhodesia)
 General Service Medal (South Africa)
 General Service Medal (Venda)
 New Zealand General Service Medal 1992 (Non-Warlike)
 New Zealand General Service Medal 1992 (Warlike)
 General Service Medal (2008)